Malta participated in the Junior Eurovision Song Contest 2017 on 26 November 2017 in Tbilisi, Georgia. The Maltese entrant for the 2017 contest was selected through a national final, organised by the Maltese broadcaster Public Broadcasting Services (PBS) on 1 July 2017, while their song was selected internally. Each of the ten participants performed covers of non-Eurovision candidate songs during the national final. Gianluca Cilia was declared winner with his cover of Perdere l'amore.

Background

Prior to the 2016 Contest, Malta had participated in the Junior Eurovision Song Contest eleven times since its first entry in 2003 only opting not to participate at the 2010, 2011 and 2012 contests. Malta has won on two occasions: in 2013 when Gaia Cauchi won with the song "The Start", and again in 2015 when Destiny Chukunyere came first with "Not My Soul" when it won the contest with 185 points, breaking the previous record held by Spain for the most points ever given to a winner.

Before Junior Eurovision

Malta Junior Eurovision Song Contest 2017
The national final took place on 1 July 2017. The national final consisted of ten competing acts participating in a televised production. Each of the 10 participants sang a song of their own choice. After all of them had performed, the results were decided through 100% televote and Gianluca Cilia as announced was the winner of the national final.

Song selection
On 30 September 2017 the Maltese broadcaster Public Broadcasting Services (PBS) announced that Gianluca Cilia will sing "Dawra Tond" at the Junior Eurovision Song Contest 2017.

Artist and song information

Gianluca Cilia

Gianluca Cilia (born 12 November 2007) is a Maltese child singer. He represented Malta at the Junior Eurovision Song Contest 2017 in Tbilisi, Georgia on 26 November 2017 with a song "Dawra tond", performed in both English and Maltese.

Gianluca started to sing at the age of 6, and he takes singing and music lessons at Harmonic Ensemble. His first participation in a major competition was in 2015, taking part in Oltroceano in Palermo, winning the festival. A year later he represented Malta in an international singing festival in Romania, placing third with his song Mamma lo canto per te. In that same year he also took part in the inaugural edition of Arpeggio, in Malta, achieving the first place. In 2020, together with Yulan Law, he took part in the Malta Junior Eurovision Song Contest 2020 with the song "Deck of Cards".

"Dawra tond"
"Dawra tond" (Maltese for round in a circle) is a song by Maltese child singer Gianluca Cilia. It represented Malta at the Junior Eurovision Song Contest 2017.

At Junior Eurovision
During the opening ceremony and the running order draw which took place on 20 November 2017, Malta was drawn to perform twelfth on 26 November 2017, following Ukraine and preceding Russia.

Voting

Detailed voting results

References

Junior Eurovision Song Contest
Malta
2017